The 2012–13 Aberdeenshire Cup was won by Fraserburgh.

First round

Second round

Semi finals

Final

Aberdeenshire Cup seasons
Aberdeenshire Cup
21st century in Aberdeenshire